Pawnee Creek may refer to:

Pawnee Creek (Colorado), a tributary of the South Platte River
Pawnee Creek (Kansas), a stream in Bourbon and Crawford counties